Bermuda Motorsports Park is a small motor racing circuit located in St. David's Island, Bermuda. It plays host to a variety of motorsport events, primarily motorcycle racing and kart racing but also motocross with a small infield dirt section.

The circuit itself is a multi-layout venue located at the eastern end of L.F. Wade International Airport, Bermuda's only airfield. The circuit is the home of the Bermuda Motorcycle Racing Club which was formed in the 1990s.

External links
 Bermuda Motorcycle Racing Club

Motorsport in Bermuda
Sports venues in Bermuda
St. David's Island, Bermuda